The Amazing Race 22 is the twenty-second season of the American reality television show The Amazing Race. It featured eleven teams of two competing in a race around the world.

The season premiered on CBS on February 17, 2013, and the two-hour season finale aired on May 5, 2013.

Professional hockey players and brothers Bates Battaglia and Anthony Battaglia were the winners of this season, while newlyweds Max Bichler and Katie Kaczor-Bichler finished in second place, and roller derby moms Mona Hinman-Egender and Beth Bandimere finished in third.

Production

Development and filming

This season was broadcast in the mid-season of the 2012–13 TV schedule. In an interview with TV Guide, host Phil Keoghan revealed that the Double Your Money prize introduced in the previous season would not be included in season 22. Instead, the twist this season was that the winners of the first leg were awarded two Express Passes: one for themselves and another that had to be given to another team before the end of Leg 4.

The route spanned  through ten countries in five different continents, with first-time visits to French Polynesia and Northern Ireland.

Dave O'Leary tore his Achilles tendon near the end of Leg 2. Though he and his son, Connor, continued to race for another two legs with Dave being forced to use a medical boot, crutches, and a wheelchair while in airports, they chose to withdraw from the competition at the start of Leg 5 after Dave was advised by his physician to have surgery on his ankle within two weeks of the original injury. Though Dave and Connor traveled to Hanoi, Vietnam, with the remaining teams, they did not participate in any tasks in that leg; instead, after arriving in Hanoi, they went directly to the pit stop to be formally eliminated. Dave returned to the United States in time to have the surgery the day before filming of the season was completed and was able to be at the finish line. He and Connor returned to compete in season 24.

The final episode was dedicated to David Gene Gibbs, a member of the camera crew, who died in a helicopter crash while filming a series for Discovery Channel.

Cast

Teams for this season included Stealing Angels vocalists Caroline Cutbirth and Jennifer Kuhle, professional hockey players and brothers Bates Battaglia and Anthony Battaglia (of the Tulsa Oilers), and YouTube vloggers Joey Graceffa and Meghan Camarena.

Chuck & Wynona were originally cast for the previous season, but had to pull out due to the death of Chuck's father.

Future appearances
Dave & Connor, Caroline & Jennifer, Jessica & John, and Joey & Meghan returned in The Amazing Race: All-Stars. Caroline & Jennifer appeared as clue givers during the finale of season 34 in Nashville.

Results
The following teams are listed with their placements in each leg. Placements are listed in finishing order. 
A  placement with a dagger indicates that the team was eliminated. 
An  placement with a double-dagger indicates that the team was the last to arrive at a pit stop in a non-elimination leg, and had to perform a Speed Bump task in the following leg. 
 An italicized and underlined placement indicates that the team was the last to arrive at a pit stop, but there was no rest period at the pit stop and all teams were instructed to continue racing. There was no required Speed Bump task in the next leg.
 A  indicates that the team won the Fast Forward. 
 A  indicates that the team used an Express Pass on that leg to bypass one of their tasks.
 A  indicates that the team used the U-Turn and a  indicates the team on the receiving end of the U-Turn.

Notes

Race summary

Leg 1 (United States → French Polynesia)

Episode 1: "Business in the Front, Party in the Back" (February 17, 2013)
Prize: Two Express Passes (awarded to Jessica & John)
Eliminated: Matt & Daniel
Locations
Los Angeles, California (Griffith Observatory) (Starting Line)
 Los Angeles → Motu Mute, French Polynesia
Motu Mute (Bora Bora Airport) 
 Anau (Maohi Protestant Church) → Motu Piti A'au (Eden Beach) 
 Motu Piti A'au (Motu Café) 
Episode summary
Teams set off from the Griffith Observatory and drove to Los Angeles International Airport, where they had to book one of two flights to the island of Bora Bora in French Polynesia. The first five teams arrived on the first flight via Air Tahiti Nui, one hour before the remaining six teams on the second flight via Air France. After landing in Bora Bora, teams found their next clue outside the Bora Bora Airport.
 In this season's first Roadblock, one team member had to sign up for one of six helicopter flights, each of which had room for two racers. Once the team members reunited, they were given their next clue.
After completing the first Roadblock, teams had to travel by water taxi to Eden Beach, where they found their next clue.
 In this leg's second Roadblock, the team member who did not perform the previous Roadblock had to search among 400 sandcastles for one with a clue buried beneath it. If a sandcastle didn't have a clue, they had to rebuild it before they could search under another. 
After completing the second Roadblock, teams had to assemble a va'a outrigger canoe and then paddle  to the pit stop at the Motu Café.
Additional notes
Katie, Jennifer, and Daniel chose to quit the second Roadblock. Max & Katie and Caroline & Jennifer were issued four-hour penalties that were applied at the start of the next leg, while Matt & Daniel were the last team to arrive at the pit stop and were therefore eliminated.

Leg 2 (French Polynesia)

Episode 2: "Loose Lips Sink Ships" (February 24, 2013)
Prize: A trip for two to London, England (awarded to Bates & Anthony)
Eliminated: Idries & Jamil
Locations
Motu Toopua (Water Taxi Pier) 
 Motu Toopua (Hilton Bora Bora Nui) 
 Bora Bora (Pofai Bay) 
 Motu Tapu  
Episode summary
At the start of this leg, teams had to board a water taxi and travel to the Hilton Bora Bora Nui, where teams had to search for a wedding chapel and find a Polynesian priest, who gave them a traditional blessing and their next clue.
 This season's first Detour was a choice between Pick a Pearl or Take a Trunk. They then had to open them until they found two red pearls, and then swim to an oyster farmer where they could trade them for their next clue. In Take a Trunk, teams dove underwater, wearing special diving helmets, to a series of treasure trunks. They then had to take a trunk over to a submerged umbrella and unpack its contents, setting up an underwater picnic table, in order to receive their next clue.
After completing the Detour, teams had to choose a personal water craft and use a map to guide them to Motu Tapu, where they found their next clue.
 In this leg's Roadblock, one team member participated in a traditional Polynesian test of strength by walking on a pair of stilts while kicking a coconut across a  stretch of beach. If they fell, they had to return to the start to resume, but the position of the coconut was not reset. Once they successfully kicked the coconut over the finish line, teams could run to the nearby pit stop.
Additional notes
Dave tore his Achilles tendon near the end of this leg while running to the pit stop.

Leg 3 (French Polynesia → New Zealand)

Episode 3: "Like James Bond Again" (March 3, 2013)
Prize: A trip for two to Bangkok, Thailand (awarded to Dave & Connor)
Locations
Tevairoa (Bora Bora Pearl Beach Resort & Spa) 
 Tevairoa → Motu Mute
 Motu Mute → Christchurch, New Zealand
Windwhistle (Rakaia River Gorge) 
Methven (Mount Hutt Station) 
Windwhistle (Terrace Downs) 
Episode summary
At the beginning of this leg, teams were instructed to fly to Christchurch, New Zealand. Teams first had to travel by water taxi back to Motu Mute, and from there, they had to fly to Christchurch. Once there, teams had to drive to the Rakaia River Gorge, where they had to choose a departure time the next day and then set up a camp for the night. At their designated time, teams had to choose a jet boat and navigate the river to find their next clue.
 This leg's Detour was a choice between Rev It Up or Reel It In. For both Detour tasks, teams had to use provided ATVs to reach their respective Detour. In Rev It Up, both team members had to drive a modified vintage car through a set of cones in under a combined 83-second time limit in order to receive their next clue.
 In this leg's Roadblock, one team member had to run a muddy obstacle course known as a "Shemozzle". They first had to don gum boots, stubbies shorts, and a burlap sack. Then, along with a shepherd and farm dog, they had to run through the course, climb over hay bales, and then finally ride an inner tube down a slide into a manure pond, all while collecting chicken eggs along the way, which they had to put in a basket at the end of the course. Once they had twelve unbroken eggs, they could receive their next clue.
Teams had to check in at the pit stop: Terrace Downs in Windwhistle.
Additional notes
All teams had to connect through Papeete, Tahiti, on their way to New Zealand. After arriving in Tahiti, Dave & Connor went to a local hospital, where Dave discovered that he had torn both his Achilles tendon and the connecting muscle. Dave & Connor purchased a boot for Dave's leg and they then returned to the airport to continue the race. 
Dave & Connor used the Express Pass they received from Jessica & John to bypass the Detour on this leg.
No team was eliminated at the end of this leg; all teams were instead instructed to continue racing.

Leg 4 (New Zealand → Indonesia)

Episode 4: "I Love Monkeys!" (March 10, 2013)
Prize:  each (awarded to Dave & Connor)
Eliminated: Jessica & John
Locations
 Christchurch → Denpasar, Indonesia
Ubud (Ubud Monkey Forest)
Gianyar (Ayung River  Pura Desa Puseh Temple) 
Badung (Bukit Peninsula – Uluwatu Surf Beach)
Badung (Bukit Peninsula – Ketut's Surf Shop) 
Badung (Bukit Peninsula – Pura Luhur Uluwatu Cliff) 
Episode summary
At the beginning of this leg, teams were instructed to fly to the island of Bali in Indonesia. Once in Bali, teams had to travel to the Ubud Monkey Forest, where they had to leave a coconut for a monkey to open, which contained their next clue inside a canister.
 This leg's Detour was a choice between Sandy Bottom or Fruity Top. In Sandy Bottom, teams had to dredge volcanic sand from the bottom of the Ayung River and transport it  uphill to a larger container. Once teams filled their container, they received their next clue. In Fruity Top, teams had to dress in sarongs and prepare a Balinese religious offering known as a gebogan from a variety of fruits. They then had to carry it in a procession to the Pura Desa Puseh Temple and place it on an altar in order to receive their next clue.
After completing the Detour, teams had to make their way to Uluwatu Surf Beach, where they found their next clue.
 In this leg's Roadblock, one team member had to go to Ketut's Surf Shop and search among several surfboards for one with an image from a previous leg: the Polynesian priest from Bora Bora. After taking a surfboard, racers had to search for their partner and make their way to the pit stop. Teams could only be checked in if they had the correct surfboard.
Additional notes
Jessica & John were eliminated without having used their Express Pass.

Leg 5 (Indonesia → Vietnam)

Episode 5: "Your Tan Is Totally Cool" (March 17, 2013)
Prize: A trip for two to Whistler, British Columbia (awarded to Pam & Winnie)
Quit: Dave & Connor
Locations
Badung (Bukit Peninsula – Pura Luhur Uluwatu Cliff) 
 Denpasar → Hanoi, Vietnam
Hanoi (Rạp Công Nhân Theater Gallery 42 ) 
Hanoi (Công Viên Thống Nhất )
Hanoi (Temple of Literature  Ngọc Sơn Temple & Hoàn Kiếm District) 
Hanoi (Downed B-52 at Hữu Tiệp Lake ) 
Hanoi (National Museum of Vietnamese History) 
Episode summary
At the beginning of this leg, teams were instructed to fly to Hanoi, Vietnam. Once in Hanoi, teams had to travel to the Rạp Công Nhân Theater Gallery 42.
 In this leg's Roadblock, one team member had to watch a performance of a Vietnamese patriotic song. After the performance, the performers revealed the phrase "" ("Glory to our young generation") to the racers, who then had five minutes to search a nearby gallery without any notes for one of several political posters with the correct phrase in order to receive their next clue. If team members were unable to identify the correct poster within the allotted time, they had to watch the performance again.
 This leg's Detour was a choice between Make Your Move or Make Your Meal. In Make Your Move, teams had to set up a human chessboard at the Temple of Literature. Using a local  board as a reference, teams had to find four human chess pieces, who were wearing symbols matching the pieces on the board, and then set them up with four staffs in position on the human chessboard in order to receive their next clue. In Make Your Meal, teams had to pick up four baskets (two empty and two with live chickens) at the Ngọc Sơn Temple, and then navigate the street market to find the rest of the ingredients on a shopping list. After acquiring the ingredients, teams had to find a cooking station to cook two  soups in order to receive their next clue.
After completing the Detour, teams had to make their way to the downed B-52 at Hữu Tiệp Lake in order to find their next clue, which directed them to the pit stop: the National Museum of Vietnamese History in Hanoi.
Additional notes
Dave & Connor chose to quit the race at the start of the leg and went directly to the pit stop after arriving in Hanoi. There was no additional elimination at the end of this leg.
 This leg featured a Double U-Turn. Pam & Winnie chose to use the U-Turn on Joey & Meghan, while Joey & Meghan chose to use the U-Turn on Chuck & Wynona.

Leg 6 (Vietnam → Botswana)

Episode 6: "Scorpion King Hunter" (March 24, 2013)
Prize: A trip for two to Phuket, Thailand (awarded to Bates & Anthony)
Locations
Hanoi (Hanoi Opera House) 
 Hanoi (Hair of the Dog) (Unaired)
 Hanoi → Maun, Botswana
 Maun → Makgadikgadi Pans National Park
Makgadikgadi Pans National Park (Old Xhumaga Road)  
Makgadikgadi Pans National Park (Meno A Kwena Safari Camp) 
Episode summary
At the beginning of this leg, teams were simply instructed to travel to Maun, and they had to figure out that the city was in Botswana. They had to identify the country to a security guard at the travel agency before they could enter to purchase their tickets. After arriving in Maun, teams signed up for one of four charter flights to the Makgadikgadi Pans National Park, where teams found their next clue.
 Before the Roadblock, teams chose a group of Kalahari Bushmen, who accompanied them for the duration of this leg. In this leg's Roadblock, one team member had to follow the Bushmen to a hole, where they were taught how to dig up a scorpion and place it carefully in a jar before they could retrieve their next clue.
After completing the Roadblock, teams had to take their group of Bushmen in their SUV to their next clue.
 This leg's Detour was a choice between Fire or Fowl. In Fire, teams traveled with their Bushmen to a nearby village, where they had to learn how to properly make fire using two sticks, zebra manure, and grass. Once they had a flame, they had to use it to light the elder Bushman's pipe in order to receive their next clue. In Fowl, teams had to learn how to set up a trap in order to catch a guineafowl. After setting up the trap properly, teams had to mimic a guineafowl and get captured in the trap before receiving their next clue.
Teams had to check in at the pit stop: the Meno A Kwena Safari Camp in the Makgadikgadi Pans National Park.
Additional notes
Before leaving Vietnam, teams had to travel to the Hair of the Dog bar, where they received their next clue from a dancer. This task was unaired.
This was a non-elimination leg.

Leg 7 (Botswana)

Episode 7: "Be Safe and Don't Hit a Cow" (March 31, 2013)
Prize:  each (awarded to Bates & Anthony)
Eliminated: Pam & Winnie
Locations
Makgadikgadi Pans National Park (Meno A Kwena Safari Camp) 
Maun (Boro Village – Makoro Polling Station)   
 Maun (Royal Tree Lodge Game Preserve)  
Episode summary
At the beginning of this leg, teams had to return to Maun and find the Makoro Polling Station.
 In this season's only Fast Forward, one team had to water ski for over a mile on the Okavango Delta. Bates & Anthony won the Fast Forward.
 In this leg's Roadblock, one team member had to transport two goats down river to a delivery point using a makoro, a traditional dugout canoe. They had to punt the makoro while their partner looked after the goats. Once the goats were delivered and the teams returned to the starting point, they received their next clue.
 For their Speed Bump, Max & Katie had to complete a traditional beaded skirt and then wear it while performing a ceremonial dance before they could continue on the race.
After completing the Roadblock, teams had to take a safari taxi along the Thamalakane River to the Royal Tree Lodge Game Preserve, where they found their next clue.
 This leg's Detour was a choice between Brains or Brawn. In Brains, teams had to go on a horseback safari and spot ten wooden animal cutouts. They then traveled to a nearby campsite and had to arrange a set of tiles featuring the silhouettes of the animals in the order that they appeared. Once they had the tiles in the correct order, they received their next clue; if not, they had to go back to the safari before being allowed another attempt.
After completing the Detour, teams had to search the game preserve for the pit stop.
Additional notes
Max and Jennifer were both issued speeding tickets by the Botswana Police Service. Botswanan law required that tickets be paid before the end of the day, so both teams had to pay their fines before they could continue racing.

Leg 8 (Botswana → Switzerland)

Episode 8: "My Cheese Is Out of Control" (April 14, 2013)
Prize: A trip for two to Bora Bora, French Polynesia (awarded to Bates & Anthony)
Eliminated: Chuck & Wynona
Locations
Maun (Royal Tree Lodge Game Preserve) 
 Maun → Zürich, Switzerland
Zürich (Zürich Airport)
 Zürich → Grindelwald
Grindelwald (Kirche Grindelwald)
 Grindelwald → Kleine Scheidegg
Kleine Scheidegg (Hotel Bellevue des Alpes)
 Kleine Scheidegg → Jungfraujoch
Jungfraujoch (Sphinx Observatory)
 Jungfraujoch → Eiger
Eiger (North Face) 
 Eiger → Grindelwald
Grindelwald (Lütschine Brüggli Bridge)
Grindelwald (Bodmi Snowboard and Ski School) 
Episode summary
At the beginning of this leg, teams were instructed to fly to Zürich, Switzerland. At the Zürich Airport, teams had to search for a conductor in a red hat, who handed them their next clue, which directed teams to travel by train to Grindelwald. Once there, teams had to wait at Kirche Grindelwald for an Alpine shepherd, who delivered them their next clue.
Teams were instructed to travel by train to Kleine Scheidegg. At the Hotel Bellevue des Alpes, teams had to pick up a "Swiss rescue companion": a St. Bernard. Teams then had to travel with the dog to the Jungfraujoch and deliver the dog to a mountain rescue guide. They were then allowed to search the Sphinx Observatory for their next clue.
 In this leg's Roadblock, one team member had to traverse the north face of the Eiger and pick up a Travelocity Roaming Gnome before traversing back to the railway station's observation deck.
After completing the Roadblock, teams had to return by train to Grindelwald and then make their way to the Lütschine Brüggli Bridge. There, teams had to follow the sound of a Swiss alphorn to their next clue. Teams then had to participate in a Switchback from season 14, where they had to use traditional sleds to transport a total of four  wheels of cheese downhill to a barn in order to receive their next clue.
Teams had to check in at the pit stop: the Bodmi Snowboard and Ski School in Grindelwald.

Leg 9 (Switzerland → Germany)

Episode 9: "The Ultimate Fun House" (April 21, 2013)
Prize: A 2013 Ford Fusion for each racer (awarded to Max & Katie)
Locations
Interlaken (Funny Farm Backpackers) 
 Interlaken → Basel
 Basel → Dresden, Germany
Dresden (Saxon State Ministry of Finance )
Berlin (Brandenburg Gate)
Berlin (Alexanderplatz – Park Inn Berlin)
Berlin (Deutsches Technikmuseum  Wasserturm Park & Buchstabenmuseum ) 
Berlin (Salon Zur Wilden Renate) 
Berlin (Kurfürstendamm – Joachimsthaler Platz ) 
Episode summary
At the beginning of this leg, teams were instructed to travel by train to Basel, and then fly to Dresden, Germany. At the Saxon State Ministry of Finance in Dresden, teams had to answer three questions in order to receive their next destination: 1) Who said "Tear down this wall!"? (Ronald Reagan); 2) Who did he say it to? (Mikhail Gorbachev); and 3) Where did President Reagan say it? (the Brandenburg Gate in Berlin).
After finding their next clue at the Brandenburg Gate, teams were directed to the Park Inn Berlin, where both teams members had to perform a BASE jump from the roof in order to receive their next clue.
 This leg's Detour was a choice between Train Trials or Font Follies. In Train Trials, teams drove to the Deutsches Technikmuseum, where they had to build a model train track circuit using all of the provided pieces such that the circuit fit on a platform. Once the train was able to make one full lap without derailing or hitting any of the scenery, they received their next clue. In Font Follies, teams had to travel to Wasserturm Park. There, they picked up two large neon alphabet letters and had to transport them intact on foot to the Buchstabenmuseum in order to receive their next clue.
After completing the Detour, teams had to drive to Salon Zur Wilden Renate, where they found their next clue.
 In this leg's Roadblock, one team member first had to answer a question – Who said "Ich bin ein Berliner"? (John F. Kennedy) – and then enter a labyrinth beneath the nightclub, where they had to search for a white room that held their next clue.
Teams had to check in at the pit stop: the Joachimsthaler Platz on the Kurfürstendamm.
Additional notes
This was a non-elimination leg.

Leg 10 (Germany → Scotland)

Episode 10: "Working Our Barrels Off" (April 28, 2013)
Prize:  each (awarded to Max & Katie)
Eliminated: Joey & Meghan
Locations
Berlin (InterContinental Berlin) 
 Berlin → Edinburgh, Scotland
Longniddry (Gosford House) 
Edinburgh (Craigmillar Castle) 
Edinburgh (Duddingston – Sheep Heid Inn) 
Edinburgh (Duddingston – Sheep Heid Inn  Alleyway) 
Edinburgh (Duddingston – Duddingston Kirk) 
Edinburgh (Old Town – Niddry Street South) 
Episode summary
At the beginning of this leg, teams were instructed to fly to Edinburgh, Scotland. Once in Edinburgh, teams had to drive themselves to Gosford House in Longniddry, where they found their next clue.
 In this leg's Roadblock, one team member had to dress in a Royal Scots regiment uniform and learn to continuously play a drone on a set of bagpipes while marching with the Royal Scots pipers in Gosford House's Marble Room for two minutes in order to receive their next clue.
After completing the Roadblock, teams had to travel to Craigmillar Castle and search the castle's fireplaces for their next clue.
 For their Speed Bump, Mona & Beth had to play a game of skittles, a traditional British form of ten-pin bowling, and score a strike before they could continue racing.
 This leg's Detour was a choice between Tasty Puddin' or Whiskey Rollin'. In Tasty Puddin', teams had to prepare haggis by filling ox intestines with oatmeal in the presence of a Robert Burns impersonator, who recited Burns' poem "Address to a Haggis". Once each team member prepared four portions of haggis and had a taste, they were given their next clue. In Whiskey Rollin', teams had to roll eight barrels of Scotch whisky up a slope and deliver them to a party in order to receive their next clue.
After completing the Detour, teams had to make their way to Duddingston Kirk in order to find their next clue directing them to the pit stop: Niddry Street South in Edinburgh's Old Town.
Additional notes
 This leg featured a Double U-Turn. Bates & Anthony chose to use the U-Turn on Joey & Meghan, while Max & Katie chose to use the U-Turn on Mona & Beth.

Leg 11 (Scotland → Northern Ireland)

Episode 11: "Beacon of Hope" (May 5, 2013)
Prize: A trip for two to Punta Cana, Dominican Republic (awarded to Max & Katie)
Eliminated: Caroline & Jennifer
Locations
Edinburgh (Johnston Terrace) 
 Edinburgh → Stranraer
 Cairnryan → Belfast, Northern Ireland
Belfast (All-Route Shipping Warehouse)
County Armagh (Peatlands Park) 
Belfast (Thanksgiving Square – Beacon of Hope)
Belfast (Titanic Quarter – Titanic's Dock & Pump House  T13 Skatepark) 
Belfast (Ulster Hall) 
Episode summary
At the beginning of this leg, teams were instructed to travel by train to Stranraer, and then by ferry to Belfast, Northern Ireland. Once in Belfast, teams had to make their way to the All-Route Shipping Warehouse, where they found their next clue.
 In this leg's Roadblock, one team member had to participate in bog snorkeling. After donning full snorkeling gear, they had to cannonball into a muddy pool, and then swim one  lap in the bog within four minutes in order to receive their next clue.
After completing the Roadblock, teams had to find "The Thing With a Ring", which they had to figure out was the Beacon of Hope sculpture in Thanksgiving Square, where they found their next clue.
 This season's final Detour was a choice between Tray It or Spray It. In Tray It, teams had to go to the drydock where the Titanic was built and serve the ship's last five-course dinner to a group of first-class passengers. Using the provided menu and a seating chart, teams had to choose the proper dishes for each course from a table full of plates and serve them to the passengers in the dining room. When the waiter was satisfied that each passenger received the correct dish for each course, the team was allowed to move on to the next course. Once all five courses were served correctly, teams received their next clue from a Captain Edward Smith impersonator. In Spray It, teams had to go to a skate park in a warehouse, where they had to finish half of a graffiti painting using a photograph as reference in order to receive their next clue.
Teams had to check in at the pit stop: Ulster Hall in Belfast.

Leg 12 (Northern Ireland → England → United States)

Episode 11: "Beacon of Hope" (May 5, 2013)
Winners: Bates & Anthony
Second Place: Max & Katie
Third Place: Mona & Beth
Locations
Belfast (Ulster Hall) 
 Belfast → Birkenhead, England
 Liverpool → London
London (Euston Tap)
 London → Washington, D.C.
Washington, D.C. (Lincoln Memorial)
Washington, D.C. (1100 Pennsylvania Avenue – Old Post Office Pavilion)
Washington, D.C. (West Potomac Park – Tidal Basin) 
Washington, D.C. (Nationals Park)
Washington, D.C. (Hains Point)
Mount Vernon, Virginia (Mount Vernon) 
Episode summary
At the beginning of this leg, teams were instructed to travel by ferry to Birkenhead, England and then by train to London. Once in London, teams had to make their way to the Euston Tap, where they each had to order a pint of beer before they were given their next clue, which instructed them to fly to Washington, D.C.
After arriving in Washington, D.C., teams had to find the location where Martin Luther King Jr. gave his famous "I Have a Dream" speech: the steps of the Lincoln Memorial. Teams were then directed to 1100 Pennsylvania Avenue, where they were escorted by "Secret Service agents" who told them that they were to have their photograph taken with President Barack Obama. In reality, they were taken to a souvenir photography studio where they posed for a photograph in which their face was superimposed meeting President Obama with their next clue printed on the back.
Teams then traveled to the Tidal Basin, where they had to search for a marked car near the paddleboat docks. After knocking on the rear window, the car's occupant gave them a briefcase along with their next clue.
 This season's final Roadblock was a Switchback from season 8. One team member had to take the briefcase and find one of fifty "spies" around the Tidal Basin who responded to their given code phrase with another supplied code phrase – Max: "Where can I get a good half-smoke with chili?" ("I've heard there's a great place on U Street."); Bates: "I did not dress warm enough for this weather." ("Perhaps you would like to borrow my gloves."); Beth: "The cherry blossoms are beautiful here in April." ("I'll have to bring my mother next spring."). They then swapped briefcases with the spy, who told them that the combination to open their new briefcase was their final placement in New Zealand (Leg 3), Indonesia (Leg 4), and Vietnam (Leg 5). After they unlocked their briefcase, they could retrieve their next clue inside.
After completing the Roadblock, teams were instructed to travel to "The Home of the Nats": Nationals Park. There, one team member had to ride a zip-line across the stadium and toss a baseball while their partner, dressed as a baseball, attempted to catch it. Once they successfully caught the ball, they could see that it had "Hains Point" written on it, which was their next destination.
At Hains Point, one team member had to enter a giant ball pit filled with globes and find ten globes marked with the countries that they visited on the race (excluding England). They had to pass the globes to their partner, who placed the globes in chronological order. Once they had all of their globes in the correct order, a giant globe opened, revealing the teams' final clue. Teams were instructed to travel to "The Home of the First President", which they had to figure out was the home of George Washington: Mount Vernon.
Additional notes
At Nationals Park, after the team member on the ground caught the ball, they had to toss the ball to a pitcher, who then pitched it to a batter, who hit it into the outfield. The team member on the ground had to then retrieve the ball before reuniting with their partner. This aspect of the task was unaired.
Legs 11 and 12 aired back-to-back as a special two-hour episode.

Reception

Critical response
The Amazing Race 22 receive mixed-to-negative reviews. Daniel Fienberg of HitFix wrote that "this wasn't an awful 'Amazing Race' season, but it was a season without a grand, building narrative." Scott Von Doviak of The A.V. Club wrote that "it really isn't [amazing] and hasn't been for a long time. It's just coasting along on inertia at this point, and apparently Bertram van Munster and company don't feel the need to shake it up much at all." Michael Hewitt of the Orange County Register was positive during the early part of the season but negative towards the end saying that the disappointing finish was "spoiling what had been a competitive revival for the show." In 2016, this season was ranked 20th out of the first 27 seasons by the Rob Has a Podcast Amazing Race correspondents.

Controversy
The Leg 5 episode in Hanoi sparked ire among some conservative media analysts and viewers for the tasks involving a performance of a communist propaganda song and the brief visit to a B-52 bomber that was shot down by North Vietnamese forces during the Vietnam War and turned into a memorial for communist Vietnam's victory. Complaints came in from sources such as the national commanders of the American Legion and VFW, and liberal Democrat strategist and Fox News pundit Bob Beckel also spoke of his disgust at the program's choices. Yahoo! later reported on comments from viewers found on Twitter whose complaints ranged from threatening to no longer watch the series or statements that the episode was "strange" or "disrespectful to Americans killed [in Vietnam]". 

Prior to the start of the episode for Leg 6, CBS aired an apology, noting that portions of the previous episode were insensitive to U.S. Armed Forces veterans. The message, read by host Phil Keoghan, stated:

Ratings
No episode aired on April 7, 2013, due to CBS and CTV's broadcasts of the Academy of Country Music Awards.

U.S. Nielsen ratings

Episode 2, "Loose Lips Sink Ships", aired on the same night as the 85th Academy Awards.
Episode 7, "Be Safe and Don't Hit a Cow", aired on Easter Sunday; the broadcast was subsequently delayed by 41 minutes in the Eastern/Central market due to the 2013 NCAA Men's Division I Basketball Tournament's Midwest Regional and South Regional final matches.
Episode 8, "My Cheese Is Out of Control", was delayed by 56 minutes in the Eastern/Central market due to the final day of the 2013 Masters golf tournament.

Canadian ratings
Canadian broadcaster CTV also aired The Amazing Race on Sundays. Episodes aired at 8:00 p.m. Eastern and Central (9:00 p.m. Pacific, Mountain and Atlantic), with two exceptions. The broadcast of the second episode conflicted with CTV's broadcast of the 85th Academy Awards; The Amazing Race was shown instead at 8:00 p.m. in the Atlantic time zone, at 7:00 p.m. in the Eastern time zone, and at 6:00 p.m. in the Central time zone, and immediately after the broadcast of the Oscars in the Pacific and Mountain time zones. The broadcast of the ninth episode conflicted with CTV's broadcast of the 2013 Juno Awards; The Amazing Race was instead shown at 7:00 p.m. in each time zone across the country.

References

External links
 Official website

 22
2013 American television seasons
Television shows filmed in Los Angeles
Television shows filmed in French Polynesia
Television shows filmed in New Zealand
Television shows filmed in Singapore
Television shows filmed in Indonesia
Television shows filmed in Vietnam
Television shows filmed in Botswana
Television shows filmed in Switzerland
Television shows filmed in France
Television shows filmed in Germany
Television shows filmed in Scotland
Television shows filmed in Northern Ireland
Television shows filmed in England
Television shows filmed in Washington, D.C.
Television shows filmed in Virginia